The following is a list of Teen Choice Award winners and nominees for Choice Movie - Sci-Fi/Fantasy. Formally awarded as two separate categories in 2010: Choice Movie - Sci-Fi and Choice Movie - Fantasy.

Winners and nominees

2010s

References

Sci-Fi Fantasy